Yassir Lester (born June 22, 1984) is an American stand-up comedian, writer, and actor. He was on the writing staff for The Carmichael Show and Girls. He is best known for his role as Chris in Making History, and a role as a stockbroker, also named Yassir, in the 2019 Showtime series Black Monday.

Early life
Lester was born in Miami, Florida.  As a child, his family relocated to Marietta, Georgia. His mother is African-American and his father is Palestinian. He aspired to be a stand-up comedian from a young age, and moved to Los Angeles at 21 to pursue a comedy career. He met Jerrod Carmichael soon after arriving and they remain close friends.

Career
In 2016, Lester simultaneously worked on the writing staff of both The Carmichael Show and Girls. He took a break to film Making History, which ran on Fox for one season. He stated that he never intended to act, and had moved to Hollywood to work in TV production and as a stand-up comedian. His friend Adam Pally, who was already attached to star, encouraged him to audition.

He was a cast member on the series Champions in 2018, which was cancelled after one season. Since 2019 he has appeared as a Muslim Wall Street trader, also named Yassir, in the Showtime series Black Monday.

In August 2021, Lester joined as screenwriter and executive producer on the upcoming superhero film Armor Wars, set in the Marvel Cinematic Universe.

Lester regularly performs stand-up comedy.

Filmography

Television

Film

Web

References

External links
 
Official Twitter

1984 births
Living people
African-American stand-up comedians
American stand-up comedians
People from Marietta, Georgia
African-American male actors
American people of Palestinian descent
American comedians of Arab descent
21st-century African-American people
20th-century African-American people